Island Transit is a zero-fare transit system in Island County, Washington, serving Whidbey Island and Camano Island. The system consists of fixed-route bus service, paratransit, and vanpools, and carried a total of 974,899 passengers in 2015. There is no Sunday or holiday service on Island Transit routes.

The system is funded by a 0.9 percent sales tax within Island County, as well as state and federal grants. The tax was initially 0.3 percent when bus service started in 1987, but was increased in 2000 and 2009 in response to funding shortfalls.

History

Island Transit was established in 1983 as a public transportation benefit area (PTBA), a type of municipal corporation in Washington state for public transit agencies. The Island County Board of Commissioners proposed the creation of a PTBA in September 1980, using a 0.3 percent sales and use tax to fund a bus system. The sales tax was part of two countywide votes in 1980 and 1982, where it was twice rejected. Following the second defeat, the boundaries of the PTBA were re-drawn to exclude part of northern Whidbey Island and all of Camano Island. The sales tax and transit system was approved by 56.5 percent of voters in a third ballot measure, held on November 8, 1983, within the revised boundaries.

A lawsuit was filed in 1985 challenging the revision of PTBA boundaries prior to the third vote, with the appellants from northern Whidbey arguing that their constitutional rights of equal protection and equal suffrage were deprived because of their inability to vote on the measure. The following year, the Washington Supreme Court upheld the PTBA's boundary revision, allowing it to begin collecting sales tax that was authorized by the vote. The PTBA renamed itself "Island Transit" and began operating fare-free service on December 1, 1987, with four bus routes covering Oak Harbor and southern Whidbey Island, vanpool service to the Boeing Everett Factory, and contracted dial-a-ride service.

In March 1992, Island Transit became the first agency in the state of Washington to operate paratransit service required by the new Americans with Disabilities Act. Later that year, northern Whidbey Island was annexed into the PTBA district after approval from voters; service to northern Whidbey Island began the following March. Camano Island voters approved annexation into the Island Transit district on May 16, 1996, after trial service to the island that began in January. The agency opened its first transit center, located in Oak Harbor, in December 1996.

The passage of Initiative 695 in November 1999 eliminated the use of motor vehicle excise tax, a funding source for local transit throughout the state, including 60 percent of Island Transit's annual fixed revenue. By the end of the year, intra-county service to Mount Vernon and Saturday service on Whidbey Island were both cancelled, and 13 employees were laid off. In May 2000, a 0.3 percent sales tax increase for Island Transit was approved, bringing the total tax to 0.6 percent. Saturday service was restored in August, and a new route to Mount Vernon began in July 2001. Intra-county service was expanded in September 2005 with the establishment of the "County Connector" network by Island Transit, Skagit Transit and Whatcom Transit Authority, with routes from Whidbey Island to Mount Vernon as well as Camano Island to Mount Vernon and Everett Station.

The sales tax was increased once again, to 0.9 percent, in 2009 by voters amidst the Great Recession and declining sales tax revenue. The agency considered introducing fares for all of its routes in 2018 to fund service improvements, but rejected the proposal due to public opposition and impacts to ridership.

Routes

All Whidbey
 Route 1: (Oak Harbor to Clinton): via Coupeville, Greenbank, South Whidbey State Park, Freeland, and Bayview
Route 1 Saturday: Oak Harbor to Coupeville/Clinton Ferries

North/Central Whidbey
 Route 3: (East Oak Harbor Shuttle): Oak Harbor to Gravel Pit, via Crescent Harbor Road
 Route 6: (Oak Harbor to Coupeville): Oak Harbor to Coupeville Ferry Terminal, via Coupeville, Fort Casey
 Route 10: (Central Oak Harbor Shuttle)
 Route 12: (West Oak Harbor Shuttle)
Route 22: Saturday (Oak Harbor City Shuttle)
NASWI Commuter: Serves Navy Personnel only (must provide credentials)

South Whidbey

 Route 57: (Clinton to Langley to Freeland): Clinton to Langley, then Freeland via Bayview through Goss lake Area
 Route 58: (Clinton): Scatchet Head to Ken's Korner through Maxwelton or Clinton Ferry
 Clinton Commuter: Designated commuter times for Routes 57, and 58
Route 60: (Saturday) Bayview to Clinton Ferry via Langley

County Wide
 Route 411W: (County Connector): Oak Harbor to March's Point, via Troxell/Ducken; connection to Skagit Transit

Camano Island

 Route 1C (West Camano Island): Terry's Corner to Camano Plaza, Lost Lake, Cama Beach, Chapman, and Huntington
 Route 2C (East Camano Island): Terry's Corner to Shuskan, via Windermere, Elger Bay
 Route 3C: Terry's Corner to Stanwood; connection to Community Transit
 Route 411C (County Connector): Terry's Corner to Mount Vernon, via Stanwood (Saturday’s this route is combined with Route 3C) 
 Route 412C (County Connector): Terry's Corner to Everett Station

Fleet

Current bus fleet

References

External links
 

Bus transportation in Washington (state)
Transportation in Island County, Washington
Zero-fare transport services
Transit agencies in Washington (state)